Iran–Qatar relations refer to the bilateral relations between the Islamic Republic of Iran and the State of Qatar. Iran has an embassy in Doha while Qatar has an embassy in Tehran. Qatar and Iran have close ties.

Both are members of the Non-Aligned Movement and the Organisation of the Islamic Conference. Unlike fellow GCC member states Saudi Arabia and the United Arab Emirates, Qatar generally refrains from criticising Iran's domestic and foreign activities. Qatar has also held several high-level meetings with Iranian officials to discuss security and economic agreements.

The two countries have a close economic relationship which affects their diplomatic relations, particularly in the oil and gas industries. A big portion of Qatar's oil comes from a field that is related to Iran. Iran and Qatar jointly control the world's largest natural gas field. Qatar has 13% of the world's total proven gas reserves. Qatar is producing 650 million cubic meters of gas per day from its section of the field, and Iran is producing 430 million cubic meters of gas per day from the same field. In addition to ties in the oil and natural gas arena, Iran and Qatar also cooperate in the shipping sector.

Bilateral relations
In 1969, during Shah Mohammad Reza Pahlavi's regime, Iran and Qatar signed a demarcation agreement.

Throughout the Iran–Iraq War (1980–1988), Qatar supported Saddam Hussein's Iraq financially by providing large loans and cash gifts. Iran's claim in May 1989 that one-third of Qatar's North Field gas reservoir lay under Iranian waters was later resolved by an agreement to exploit the field jointly.

Qatar has maintained cordial relations with Iran. In 1991, following the end of the Gulf War, the former emir of Qatar Hamad bin Khalifa welcomed Iranian participation in Persian Gulf security arrangements, however, due to resistance from other Persian Gulf Arab States these never came into fruition. However, Qatar maintains security cooperation with Iran through bilateral ties. Additionally, plans were in progress in 1992 to pipe water from the Karun River in Iran to Qatar, but after local resistance in Iran, this was laid to rest.

In February 2010, during a Q&A session following U.S. Secretary of State Hillary Clinton’s speech at the US-Islamic World Forum in Doha, Prime Minister Sheikh Hamad bin Jassim bin Jaber Al Thani conceded that if Iran’s nuclear program spurs "a nuclear race in the region, it will be an unhealthy race for all". Sheikh Jaber also advocated for “direct dialogue between Iran and the United States.”

In May 2010, Emir of Qatar Sheikh Hamad bin Khalifa Al Thani and Syrian President Bashar al Assad expressed support for Turkish-led efforts to bring about a diplomatic resolution to the dispute over Iran's nuclear program. Turkish officials proposed to mediate direct talks between Iran's top nuclear negotiator Saeed Jalili and EU foreign policy chief Catherine Ashton.

In May 2021, former president Mahmoud Ahmadinejad revealed that former Emir of Qatar Sheikh Hamad Bin Khalifa Al Thani paid $57 million in ransom to free 57 IRGC fighters captured by an armed opposition group in southern Damascus in late 2012.

Cooperation
Qatar shares a great relation with Iran. Both countries own the South Pars / North Dome Gas-Condensate field, the world's largest gas field, having a big influence in the Irani-Qatari relation.

On 11 January 2009, representatives from the three countries (Qatar, Iran, and Russia) met in Tehran, agreeing on the production of their gas reserves.

On 12 April 2022, Iran struck a number of agreements with Qatar in the hopes of hosting fans of the men's football World Cup, which will be hosted in the neighbouring country later this year. According to Qatar News Agency, the two countries signed an agreement for operations to connect the Doha Flight Information Region (FIR) with the Tehran FIR. They also agreed to expand the number of flights between them and talked about ways to improve transportation cooperation and private investment prospects in the port sector.

Tensions
Qatar has a difficult time when it comes to maintaining a good sustainable relationship with Iran, as well as adopting the policies set by the Gulf Cooperation Council (GCC) towards it. They are treading lightly on both sides in pursuance of their own self-interests. However, trying to maintain a good relationship with the GCC and Iran has led to tensions.

On 2 July 2011, the GCC unanimously agreed to have a combined military force, leading to an increase of double the current troop size. Dr. Sami Al-Faraj, stated that the decision was made in order to counter a growing threat from Iran “and its subversive terrorist elements across the GCC".

COVID-19 pandemic 
During the COVID-19 pandemic, Qatar sent five shipments of urgent medical assistance to Iran including respirators, sanitizers, and vaccines between March 2020 and September 2021.

Iran and Qatar prior to and during the Iranian Revolution
The large landscape in the Persian Gulf made Iran grow a rising military and economic power, whereas Qatar is small. In the 1970s Qatar tried not to upset Saudi Arabia by following the OPEC policies, and at the same time not oppose Iran with the Oil prices.

Leading up to the Iranian Revolution in 1979, Qatar and Iran shared a friendly relationship. This was exemplified by the support of the government of Qatar and Sheikh Khalifah for the monarchy of Iran, stating that “Iran is a dear and friendly neighbor with which we are united by the brotherhood of Islam”. The desire to keep up friendly relations was motivated by Iran's status as a military and economic powerhouse as well as interests with OPEC.

Although there was some apprehension about the introduction of regional instability after the rise of the Islamic Republic, a delegation of 70 Shia Qatari's met with Ayatollah Khomeini to express their support for the revolution.

Oil and gas relations

North Field and South Pars

The world's largest natural gas field, called North Field (Qatar) and South Pars (Iran) is between the boundaries of Qatar and Iran. The gas field covers 97,000 square km with the majority (about two-thirds) lying in Qatari waters. Although the field is jointly owned, there is an uneven distribution in natural gas extraction. Namely, Qatar extracts about three times as much natural gas from the field as Iran does and continues to grow its extraction. It is estimated that Qatar's total income from the field was about $37 billion.

Iran’s natural gas expansion efforts 
Iran's oil minister Rostam Qasemi predicted back in 2012 that Iran would match the extraction levels of Qatar by March 2014 - but his prediction was quite off. In 2013 Iran again made an effort to develop its pace in extracting gas from the field by 2018 under the Rouhani administration. Whether or not this will happen remains to be seen.

Criticism in the Iranian media
The Iranian print media heavily criticizes the uneven distribution of oil and gas extraction from South Pars. They criticize both Qatar for the excessive nature of the extraction as well as Iranian officials for their inability to match Qatar's extraction numbers and revenues. This has also placed pressure on the Rouhani administration to increase oil extraction in South Pars.

Timeline

1980s: Iraqi Invasion of Iran
At the onset of the Iran–Iraq War in 1980, Qatar, along with Oman, opted for minimal support to Iraq, whereas Saudi Arabia and Kuwait openly provided financial support to Iraq. Qatar strategically attempted to avoid upsetting either party in the interests of not being drawn into a military conflict. The government of Qatar was also aware that it would risk marginalizing its minority Shia population if it threw its full weight behind Iraq. They were put in uncomfortable situations; in 1983 Iraq attacked Iranian oil fields in the Persian Gulf, threatening plants on the Qatari coast, forcing Qatar to build barriers so it would not be affected.

As the war ended, Iran sided with Qatar during the dispute with Bahrain over the Fasht a-Dibal Islands. However Qatar did not support Iran when it came to the three islands, Lesser and Greater Tunbs and Abu Musa, instead supporting the United Arab Emirates (UAE). Qatar believed that its relationship with the GCC was strategically more important than its relationship with Iran.

December 2008: Concern on Iran nuclear power
The five permanent members of the UN security council (and Germany) held a meeting with a coalition of Arab nations consisting of Saudi Arabia, the United Arab Emirates, Kuwait, Bahrain, Qatar, Jordan, Iraq, and Egypt over the perceived threat of Iran's nuclear weapons to the whole MENA region.

In response to the nuclear powers, the GCC (including Qatar) are set to spend $122 billion on weapons over the next decade.

May 2009: South Pars Gas field
Iran and Qatar both own the South Pars / North Dome Gas-Condensate field. Iran agreed that they would issue $100 million in bonds to build and improve the gas field.

December 2010: Military cooperation
An officer in Iran's Islamic Revolutionary Guards Corps (IRGC) met with the commander of the Qatari army, stating that “IRGC and Qatar's navy can have close cooperation in intelligence, security and training fields". 
Hamad bin Ali Al Attiyah, Qatar's Minister of Defense, met with the naval forces of Iran and stated that Qatar is ready to have joint military exercises with Iran.

January 2011: Bahrain's Shia uprising
Qatar was one of the few GCC countries that stopped criticizing Iran's alleged "interference" in Bahrain. They held economic agreements during that period of time. Qatar did not officially state they support Iran's alleged interference, however, they did not criticize them for their alleged involvement. Iran denies interfering in Bahrain's internal affairs.

January 2014: Qatar offers Iran help with extracting gas
Qatar offered Iran to help extract its side of South Spars, the world's largest gas field. This would not only maximize Iran's rewards but also Qatar's. Iran requested Qatar's help, and they responded willingly.

A Qatari government official said, “There has been a lot of drilling activity in that area and we have many studies on the field that I’m sure can benefit Iran”. Too much drilling activity done by Iran might affect Qatar, as that might damage the fields.

2016 attack on the Saudi diplomatic missions in Iran

Qatar condemned the attack and decided to recall its ambassador from Tehran, while the Qatari Foreign Affairs Ministry issued a protest statement to the Iranian embassy in Doha, saying that the attack constitutes a violation of the international charters and norms that emphasize the protection of diplomatic missions and their staff. It was the last country to back Saudi Arabia by recalling its ambassador.

2017 Iranian support for Qatar

During the Qatar diplomatic crisis, Iran provided diplomatic and economic support to Qatar. On June 5, the day that the crisis erupted, Iran asked the Arab nations to settle their dispute through dialogue. After Saudi Arabia and its Persian Gulf allies blocked Qatar economically, Iran sent food supplies, amounting to 1,100 tons of fruit and vegetables and 66 tons of beef, to Qatar on a daily basis. On 25 June, Iranian president Hassan Rouhani denounced the "siege" on Qatar, and in a phone call with Sheik Tamim, said that "Tehran will stand by Qatar's government". He also noted that Iran's airspace was open to Qatari aircraft.

On 23 August 2017, it was announced that Qatar would be returning its ambassador to Iran. In a press statement released by Qatar's foreign ministry, Qatar expressed its willingness to improve bilateral ties with Iran.

On 26 August 2018, during a phone conversation between Emir of Qatar and Iranian President Rouhani, Sheikh Tamim bin Hamad Al-Thani stated that “Thanks to the integrity and solidarity of Qatari people and cooperation and help of friend countries, especially Iran, we have overcome the issues of the unjust, cruel siege and we will never forget Iran’s stances in this regard.”

Country comparison

Iranian Embassy 
The Iranian embassy is located in Doha.

 Ambassador Hamidreza Dehghani

Qatari Embassy 
The Qatari embassy is located in Tehran.

 Ambassador Mohammed Ben Hamad Al-Hajri

See also
 Iranians in Qatar
 Qatar–Saudi Arabia relations
 Qatar–Saudi Arabia diplomatic conflict
 Qatar diplomatic crisis
 Iran–Saudi Arabia relations
 Iran–Saudi Arabia proxy conflict

References

External links

 
Qatar
Iran
Relations of colonizer and former colony